Eophycis is an extinct genus of prehistoric morid gadiform fish that lived during the early Oligocene epoch in the Paratethys ocean in what now the Polish Carpathians.

See also

 Prehistoric fish
 List of prehistoric bony fish

References

Oligocene fish
Moridae
Prehistoric ray-finned fish genera